Yirmisekizzade Mehmed Said Pasha (died October 1761), earlier in his life known as Mehmed Said Efendi (sometimes spelled Sahid Mehemet Effendi in France), was an Ottoman statesman and diplomat. He was Grand Vizier of the Ottoman Empire from October 25, 1755, to April 1, 1756.

He was a son of Yirmisekiz Mehmed Çelebi, ambassador of the Ottoman Empire to France in 1720–21. Mehmed Said was of Georgian descent through his father. His epithet Yirmisekizzade, meaning "son of twenty-eight" in Turkish, is a reference to his father's own epithet Yirmisekiz ("twenty-eight"), a reference to Yirmisekiz Mehmed Çelebi's membership in the 28th battalion (orta) of the Janissaries early in his life. He already accompanied his father during this first mission as his personal secretary. He is said to have enjoyed the French culture and lifestyle tremendously, and ended up speaking French fluently.

Mehmed Said was himself dispatched for an embassy in Paris in 1742, as well as another more historically significant one in Sweden in 1733 and Poland, which led to his writing a sefaretname like his father. In Sweden, he succeeded Mustapha Aga as ambassador.

He briefly served as the Shaykh al-Islam between 1749 and 1750.

See also
 Franco-Ottoman alliance
 List of Turkish diplomats

Notes

References

 Fatma Müge Göçek East encounters West: France and the Ottoman Empire in the eighteenth century Oxford University Press US, 1987 
 Colin Imber, Keiko Kiyotaki, Rhoads Murphey Frontiers of Ottoman studies: state, province, and the West I.B.Tauris, 2005 

1761 deaths
18th-century writers from the Ottoman Empire
18th-century Grand Viziers of the Ottoman Empire
18th-century diplomats
18th-century Ottoman governors of Egypt
Georgians from the Ottoman Empire
Ambassadors of the Ottoman Empire to France
Political people from the Ottoman Empire
Islam in France
Muslims from Georgia (country)
Ambassadors of the Ottoman Empire to Sweden
Ottoman governors of Egypt
Shaykh al-Islāms
Sheikh-ul-Islams of the Ottoman Empire